Pamela Bellwood (born Pamela King) is an American actress known for her role as Claudia Blaisdel Carrington on the 1980s prime time soap opera, Dynasty.

Life and career 
Bellwood became interested in an acting career when she portrayed Emily in Our Town. She studied acting in New York with Sanford Meisner at the Neighborhood Playhouse, and in London. By 1972 she was on Broadway, taking over from Blythe Danner in Butterflies Are Free and appearing with Barbara Bel Geddes in Finishing Touches. Her performance in Butterflies Are Free earned her a Clarence Derwent Award in 1972.

Early on, Bellwood was credited as Pamela Kingsley because there was already a working actress named Pamela King. In 1974, she appeared in an episode of Paul Sand in Friends and Lovers. Later in 1974, she appeared as Jill Martin in an episode of Rhoda entitled "9-E is available". In 1978, she played the starring role of TV executive Ellen Cunningham in W.E.B., an NBC drama about a fictional television network. Poor ratings led to the show being cancelled after only five episodes.

Bellwood was an original cast member of Dynasty in January 1981, and was written out of the series early in the third season, in late 1982. She appeared once in March 1983 to help usher in Jack Coleman as a recast Steven Carrington, and later returned full-time in October 1983. She remained a key character for several seasons until leaving the series a final time in 1986 to become a full-time mother. 20 years later, in 2006, she appeared with her former Dynasty castmates in the non-fiction special Dynasty Reunion: Catfights & Caviar.

Bellwood posed for an eight-page pictorial in the April 1983 edition of Playboy magazine.

She also appeared in such films as Two-Minute Warning, Airport '77 and The Incredible Shrinking Woman, as well as a number of TV movies. She continues to perform in film and on stage. She is now known and often credited as Pamela Bellwood-Wheeler.

Personal life
In the early 1970s, Bellwood was married to writer Peter Bellwood. In 1984, she married photographer Nik Wheeler.

Filmography

Film

Television

References

External links 
 
 
 

Living people
20th-century American actresses
21st-century American actresses
American film actresses
American soap opera actresses
American television actresses
Actresses from New York City
Neighborhood Playhouse School of the Theatre alumni
Year of birth missing (living people)